Super Cena may refer to:

 John Cena (born 1977), American professional wrestler
 Roman Reigns (born 1985), American professional wrestler

Super Cena